Argynna is a genus of fungi within the Argynnaceae family. This is a monotypic genus, containing the single species Argynna polyhedron.

References

External links 
 Argynna at Index Fungorum

Dothideomycetes enigmatic taxa
Monotypic Dothideomycetes genera